Bernardino de Carmona was a Roman Catholic prelate who served as Titular Bishop of Soltania (1551–1553) and Auxiliary Bishop of Santiago de Compostela (1551–1553).

Biography
On 10 July 1551, Bernardino de Carmona was selected by the King of Spain and confirmed by Pope Julius III as Auxiliary Bishop of Santiago de Compostela and titular bishop of Soltania. 
On 5 February 1553 he was consecrated bishop by Juan Suárez Carvajal, Bishop of Lugo, with Vasco de Quiroga, Bishop of Michoacán, and Tomás de San Martín, Bishop of La Plata o Charcas, serving as co-consecrators.

References

External links and additional sources
 (for Chronology of Bishops) 
 (for Chronology of Bishops) 

Bishops appointed by Pope Julius III